Wesley "Wes" Frensdorff (22 July 1926 – 17 May 1988) was the bishop of the Episcopal Diocese of Nevada 1972 to 1985.

Early life and education
Frensdorff was born on July 22, 1926, in Hanover, Germany, the son of Rudolph August Frensdorff and Erma Margarete Asch. He came to the United States in 1940 as a 14-year-old, and completed high school in Elmhurst, New York. He was a graduate of Columbia University with a Bachelor of Arts in 1948 and the General Theological Seminary with a Bachelor of Sacred Theology in 1951.

Ordination
Frensdorff was ordained deacon on March 31, 1951, and priest on November 3, 1951. Between 1951 and 1954 he served as vicar of St Mary's Church in Winnemucca, Nevada, St Andrew's Church in Battle Mountain, Nevada and St Anne's Church in McDermitt, Nevada. Later he became rector of St Paul's Church in Elko, Nevada. In 1959 he became rector of St Barnabas and St Luke's Church in Wells, Nevada and of St Martin's Church in the Upper Skagit Valley and Community Church in Newhalem, Washington, all posts held till 1962. He became Dean of St Mark's Cathedral in Salt Lake City in 1962 and remained there till 1972. He also served as Director of the North Pacific and Western parish training program of the Episcopal Church between 1959 and 1964.

Bishop
On September 24, 1971, he was elected Bishop of Nevada, the first bishop after the establishment of the diocese in 1971. He was consecrated on March 4, 1972, by Presiding Bishop John E. Hines. He remained in Nevada till 1985 when he became assistant bishop in Arizona. From 1983 to 1985 he also served as interim bishop of the Navajoland Area Mission.

Death
Frensdorff died in a private plane crash near the north rim of the Grand Canyon on May 17, 1988.

Personal life
Frensdorff married Dolores Stoker in 1953 with whom he had 5 children.

References

External links
 Obituary from Episcopal News Service

1926 births
1988 deaths
20th-century Anglican bishops in the United States
Columbia University alumni
Episcopal bishops of Arizona
Episcopal bishops of Navajoland
Episcopal bishops of Nevada